The APL Character Set for Workspace Interchange, registered for use with ISO/IEC 2022 as ISO-IR-68, is a character set developed by the APL Working Group of the Canadian Standards Association. IBM calls it Code page 371. It is one of several APL code pages used for the syntax and symbols used by the APL programming language.

Character set

Composite characters
The encoding intends that certain of the above characters should be able to be represented at the same character position to produce additional symbols required for APL as composite characters, such as the following:

References 

Character sets
APL programming language family